Sidebottom is a surname of Old English origin (see Surname Database), and may refer to:

Allan Sidebottom (born 1959), former Australian rules footballer
Arnie Sidebottom (born 1954), England cricketer, father of Ryan
Frank Sidebottom, comic character
Garry Sidebottom (1954-2019), former Australian rules football player
Geoff Sidebottom (1936-2008), English professional footballer who played as goalkeeper
Harry Sidebottom, British author, scholar and historian
James Sidebottom (1824-1871), British businessman and Conservative Party politician
John K. Sidebottom OBE (1880-1954), British philatelist
Ryan Sidebottom (born 1978), former England international cricketer
Ryan Sidebottom (Australian cricketer) (born 1989), Australian cricketer
Sid Sidebottom (born 1951), Australian former politician
Steele Sidebottom (born 1991), professional Australian rules football player
Tom Harrop Sidebottom (1826-1908), British businessman and Conservative Party politician who represented Stalybridge
Walter Sidebottom (1921-1943), English footballer
William Sidebottom (cricketer) (1862-1948), Australian cricketer
William Sidebottom (English politician) (1841-1933), English Conservative politician who represented High Peak
William Sidebottom (RAF officer) DFC (1893-1920), British World War I flying ace credited with fourteen aerial victories

See also
Sidebotham
Sidebottom v Kershaw, Leese & Co Ltd, a UK company law case, concerning the alteration of a company's constitution, and the rights of a minority shareholder

English-language surnames